Tan Jiaxin (born December 3, 1996 in Changsha) is an elite Chinese gymnast.

Career

2012
Although she did not make the 2012 Summer Olympics in London, Tan has continued to compete and become a strong player for China. Later in 2012, she competed at the Chinese Individual Nationals in the fall, winning silver on uneven bars.

2013
In 2013, she won gold on uneven bars at the Doha World Cup. She won team bronze medals at the Chinese Nationals and Chinese National Games, and also placed sixth on vault in the latter competition. She was named to the Chinese team for the East Asian Games, where she won gold with her team and on uneven bars, and silver on vault.

In November, she was named to the Chinese team for the Stuttgart World Cup, where she won the gold medal in the Team Challenge

2014
Tan did not compete at Chinese Nationals in May.

Tan was named to the team selected to compete at both the Asian Games in Incheon and World Championships in Nanning. Alongside teammates Yao Jinnan, Shang Chunsong, Huang Huidan, Chen Siyi, and Bai Yawen, the Chinese team won gold in Incheon ahead of the North Korean and Japanese teams and silver in Nanning behind the United States and ahead of Russia. Individually at Worlds, Tan placed third in the uneven bars qualifications with a score of 15.333 points but was unable to compete in the final due to the two-per-country rule; teammates Yao and Huang placed ahead of her in first and second place, respectively.

2015
Tan participated in the World Championships in Glasgow. Again, the Chinese team won a silver medal behind the United States, and this time ahead of Great Britain. Tan contributed one of the highest scores in vault (tied with Wang Yan) of the Chinese team and 15.133 in the uneven bars behind Fan Yilin and Shang Chunsong during the team final.

2016
At age 19, Tan won gold medal with her team at the Chinese Nationals, and also won silver medal on the uneven bars.  Tan was initially named as an alternate to China's 2016 Olympics team, but after teammate Liu Tingting suffered an injury and pulled out, she was named to the 2016 Olympic team.

Competitive history

References

External links 
Tan Jiaxin at Fédération Internationale de Gymnastique

1996 births
Living people
Chinese female artistic gymnasts
Olympic gymnasts of China
Olympic medalists in gymnastics
Gymnasts at the 2016 Summer Olympics
2016 Olympic bronze medalists for China
Medalists at the World Artistic Gymnastics Championships
Gymnasts at the 2014 Asian Games
Asian Games medalists in gymnastics
Asian Games gold medalists for China
Medalists at the 2014 Asian Games
Sportspeople from Changsha
Gymnasts from Hunan